Rank comparison charts of armies/land forces of apartheid states and territories in Southern Africa.

This chart includes of the nominally independent Bantustans, apartheid South Africa, and South West Africa. These states were all under the control of the apartheid regime of South Africa, with the defence forces of the Bantustans being made of units that were nominally independent of the SADF, but were selected and trained by the SADF, and who placed former South African and Rhodesian military officers in senior positions within the defence forces. The South West Africa Territorial Force was an auxiliary arm of the SADF and formed the armed forces of South West Africa from 1977 to 1989.

Armies
Officers

Other ranks

Air forces

Officers

Other ranks

See also

 South African military ranks
 Military ranks of Namibia
 Military ranks of Zimbabwe
 Military ranks of Rhodesia

Notes

References

 
 
 Transkei Special Forces Captain Rank insignia
 Transkei Special Forces 1st Lieutenant Rank insignia
 Bophuthatswana Arm Brassard
 Bophuthatswana and Transkei Rank insignia
 Ciskei Corporal insignia
 Ciskei Lance Corporal insignia
 Transkei General's Tunic
 Transkei Staff Sergeant
 Transkei rank star in circlet
 Ciskei WO2 rank in metal
 Ciskei WO2 rank in cloth
 Bophuthatswana Special Forces Soldiers of various ranks
 Sergeant and Major of 32 Battalion of the South African Army
 Transkei Officers
 South West Africa Territorial Force rank chart
 Transkeian Defence Force rank chart

External links
 Bophuthatswana ranks at Uniforminsignia.org
 Transkei ranks at Uniforminsignia.org
 South West Africa ranks at Uniforminsignia.org
 South Africa ranks at Uniforminsignia.org

Military ranks of South Africa
History of South Africa
South Africa and the Commonwealth of Nations